Sengalam is an 2023 Indian Tamil-language Political  Thriller  streaming television series written and directed by S. R. Prabhakaran for ZEE5 which focuses on the world of politics in Virudhunagar, Tamil Nadu. The show producer by Abinesh Elangovan under the banner of Abi and Abi Productions.

The principal characters of the series include Vani Bhojan and Kalaiyarasan. The eight episodic series is scheduled to premiere on ZEE5 on 24 March 2023.

Synopsis
The story revolves around the life of the various political families of the district, and what they do for their political gains are conveyed.

Cast

Main 
 Vani Bhojan as Surya Kala
 Kalaiyarasan

Recurring 
 Sharath Lohithaswa
 Viji Chandrasekhar
 Shali Nivekas
 Manasa Radhakrishnan
 Vela Ramamoorthy
 Bagavathi Perumal
 Muthu Kumar
 Daniel Annie Pope
 Arjai
 Prem Kumar
 Pawan
 Gajaraj
 Pooja Vaidyanath

Development

Production
The series is produced by Abinesh Elangovan under the production house of Abi and Abi Productions, with music composed by Dharan Kumar and screenplay and director by S. R. Prabhakaran. S. R. Prabhakaran marked his web series debut with this series.

Casting
Vani Bhojan was cast in the female lead role, Kalaiyarasan plays the male lead alongside her.

Release
It was announced on Wednesday 18 March 2023 that the series will be released on 24 March 2023 in Tamil and Telugu languages on ZEE5. The first Trailer was unveiled on 18 March 2023.

References

External links 
 

ZEE5 original programming
Tamil-language web series
2023 Tamil-language television series debuts
Tamil-language thriller television series
Tamil-language melodrama television series
Tamil-language political television series